The Bay of Buena Vista is a bay on Cuba's northern Atlantic shore. It is located in the northern part of the provinces of Sancti Spíritus, Villa Clara and Ciego de Ávila, between mainland Cuba and the archipelago that lines its northern coast.

Overview

The many cays that define the bay's northern limits include Cayo Francés, Cayo Fragoso and Cayo Santa Maria of the Sabana-Camaguey Archipelago, and past them, the bay opens in the Nicholas Channel to the north-west and in the Old Bahamas Channel to the north-east.

The southern edge lies in the municipalities of Caibarién, Yaguajay, Chambas and Morón as well as the Bay of Dogs (Bahia Perros). To the east it is bordered by Cayo Coco and Cayo Guillermo of the Jardines del Rey archipelago and the Bay of Jiguey.

Conservation
Caguanes National Park is established on the southern shore. The bay itself is a Biosphere reserve and a Ramsar Convention site. The strictly protected area extends for  into the bay. Other ecological reserves are established on Cayo Francés, Cayo Santa María, Cayo Guillermo and Cayo Coco, while a fauna reserve is set up on Cayo Las Loras. Buffer zones are established in the form of further protected areas in Jobo Rosado and Boquerones on the mainland.

The cays contain more than 20 endemic species.

References

External links
All you need to know about Cayo Santa Maria 

Bays of Cuba
Estuaries of North America
Geography of Ciego de Ávila Province
Geography of Sancti Spíritus Province
Geography of Villa Clara Province
Biosphere reserves of Cuba
Ramsar sites in Cuba